Vanessa Czarnecki (born 21 December 1979) is a Greek softball player. She competed in the women's tournament at the 2004 Summer Olympics. A native of California, Czarnecki is of Greek descent and played collegiate softball with the Fresno State Bulldogs.

References

1979 births
Living people
Greek softball players
Olympic softball players of Greece
Softball players at the 2004 Summer Olympics
People from Fontana, California
Softball players from California
American people of Greek descent
Fresno State Bulldogs softball players